Alfredo Del Francia (7 June 1944 – 9 May 2006) was an Italian fencer. He competed in the team foil events at the 1968 and 1972 Summer Olympics.

References

1944 births
2006 deaths
Italian male fencers
Olympic fencers of Italy
Fencers at the 1968 Summer Olympics
Fencers at the 1972 Summer Olympics
Fencers from Rome